The 1891 Wimbledon Championships took place on the outdoor grass courts at the All England Lawn Tennis Club in Wimbledon, London, United Kingdom. The tournament ran from 29 June until 9 July. It was the 15th staging of the Wimbledon Championships, and the first Grand Slam tennis event of 1891. There were 22 competitors for the men's singles. Wilfred Baddeley was 19 years, 5 months and 23 days old when he won the men's singles final on 4 July.  The ladies' singles and men's doubles were held after the men's singles had been completed.

Champions

Men's singles

 Wilfred Baddeley defeated  Joshua Pim, 6–4, 1–6, 7–5, 6–0

Women's singles

 Lottie Dod defeated  Blanche Hillyard, 6–2, 6–1

Men's doubles

 Herbert Baddeley /  Wilfred Baddeley defeated  Joshua Pim /  Frank Stoker, 6–1, 6–3, 1–6, 6–2

References

External links
 Official Wimbledon Championships website

 
Wimbledon Championships
Wimbledon Championships
Wimbledon Championships
June 1891 sports events
July 1891 sports events